Maya Petrovna Belenkaya (born 1 May 1931) is a former Soviet figure skater. With her partner Igor Moskvin, she became a three-time Soviet national champion (1952–1954).

Personal life
Maya Belenkaya was born on 1 May 1931 in Leningrad (Saint Petersburg). A resident of the city throughout her whole life, she survived the Siege of Leningrad and was awarded the Medal "For the Defence of Leningrad".

Career
Belenkaya started skating at the age of 12 at the Pioneers Palace. Her first coach was A. Zhdanov. She competed both in singles and pairs.

Belenkaya and Igor Moskvin won their first national medal, silver, in 1950. After another silver in 1951, they took gold for three consecutive years from 1952 to 1954 and then placed second behind Lidia Garasimova / Yuri Kiselev for the next two years. In 1956, Belenkaya/Moskvin were sent to their first and only European Championships and finished 11th at the event in Paris. In 1957 and 1958, they finished third at the Soviet Championships, behind Nina Zhuk / Stanislav Zhuk and Ludmila Belousova / Oleg Protopopov.

After retiring from competition, Belenkaya coached numerous singles and pairs skaters to national titles, most notably Alexei Mishin and Liudmila Smirnova / Andrei Suraikin.

Results

Singles

Pairs with Moskvin

References

1931 births
Living people
Russian female pair skaters
Russian female single skaters
Soviet female pair skaters
Soviet female single skaters
Figure skaters from Saint Petersburg
Soviet figure skating coaches
Female sports coaches
Russian figure skating coaches